Ozutsu (means "big pipe" literally) may refer to:

Ōzutsu（大筒）, a 16th-century Japanese term referring to Japanese artillery
Ōzutsu Man'emon (1869–1918), sumo wrestler, the 18th Yokozuna
Ōzutsu Takeshi (b. 1956), sumo wrestler